The Archdiocesan Athletic Association (AAA) is a high school athletic conference comprising private high schools located in the St. Louis, Missouri metro area. Most are Catholic schools, operated by the Archdiocese of St. Louis.

Members
The Archdiocesan Athletic Association consists of eleven high schools.  The conference is divided into two divisions, split into larger and smaller schools.  The conference comprises schools in Class 3, Class 4 and Class 5 (in basketball).

Archdiocesan Athletic Association (AAA)

References

Missouri high school athletic conferences
High school sports conferences and leagues in the United States